Nermin Crnkić (born 31 August 1992) is a Bosnian professional footballer who plays as a left winger. He most recently played for Bosnian Premier League club Tuzla City.

Born in Bosnia and Herzegovina, Crnkić moved to the United States when he was seven years old, and gained US citizenship as well.

Career statistics

Club

Honours
Jablonec
Czech Supercup: 2013

References

External links
Nermin Crnkić at Sofascore
Nermin Crnkić at iDNES.cz

1992 births
Living people
1. SC Znojmo players
FK Jablonec players
Czech First League players
Sandvikens IF players
Flint City Bucks players
ŠK Slovan Bratislava players
Slovak Super Liga players
FK Sarajevo players
FC Rot-Weiß Erfurt players
FK Tuzla City players 
3. Liga players
Premier League of Bosnia and Herzegovina players
American soccer players
American expatriate sportspeople in Sweden
American expatriate sportspeople in the Czech Republic
American expatriate sportspeople in Slovakia
American expatriate soccer players in Germany
American expatriate sportspeople in Bosnia and Herzegovina
Soccer players from Michigan
Expatriate footballers in Slovakia
Expatriate footballers in the Czech Republic
Expatriate footballers in Sweden
Expatriate footballers in Bosnia and Herzegovina
Association football midfielders